Ourtzagh is a town in Taounate Province, Taza-Al Hoceima-Taounate, Morocco. According to the 2004 census, it has a population of 15,216.

References

Populated places in Taounate Province
Rural communes of Fès-Meknès